Bolmin  is a village in the administrative district of Gmina Chęciny, within Kielce County, Świętokrzyskie Voivodeship, in south-central Poland.

The village has a population of approximately 1,100.

History
In 1688, the village was owned by Aleksander Strzyzowski of the clan Gozdawa.

References

Bolmin